Purua is a locality north west of Whangarei in Northland, New Zealand. A hill also called Purua with a summit 387 m above sea level lies to the east. The area mainly consists of rolling hills and river flats. Farming is Dairy, Sheep and Beef. The local hall is one of the notable buildings.

Education

Notes

Whangarei District
Populated places in the Northland Region